1935–36 Yorkshire Cup

The  Yorkshire Cup competition was a knock-out competition between (mainly professional) rugby league clubs from  the  county of Yorkshire. The actual area was at times increased to encompass other teams from  outside the  county such as Newcastle, Mansfield, Coventry, and (as applying for this season) even London (in the form of Acton & Willesden. The competition always took place early in the season, in the Autumn, with the final taking place in (or just before) December (The only exception to this was when disruption of the fixture list was caused during, and immediately after, the two World Wars)

1935–36 was the twenty-eighth occasion on which the Yorkshire Cup competition had been held.

Leeds won the trophy by beating York by the score of 3-0

The match was played at Thrum Hall, Halifax, now in West Yorkshire. The attendance was 14,616 and receipts were £1,113

This was Leeds' fifth of six victories in a period of ten years, during which time they won every Yorkshire Cup final in which they appeared. Also the  second of two consecutive victories which they would enjoy.

Background 

This season there were no junior/amateur clubs taking part, no "leavers",  but there was one new entrant in the  form of New London Club Acton & Willesden, thus increasing last year's total entrants to sixteen.

This in turn resulted in no byes in the first round.

Competition and results

Round 1 
Involved  8 matches (with no byes) and 16 clubs

Round 2 – quarterfinals 
Involved 4 matches and 8 clubs

Round 3 – semifinals  
Involved 2 matches and 4 clubs

Round 3 – semifinals  - Replay 
Involved 2 matches and 4 clubs

Final

Teams and scorers 

Scoring - Try = three (3) points - Goal = two (2) points - Drop goal = two (2) points

The road to success

Notes and comments 
1 * New London club Acton & Willesden's first (and last) match in Yorkshire Cup. The club folded at the end of the season

2 * Thrum Hall was the home ground of Halifax with a final capacity of 9,832 (The attendance record of 29,153 was set on 21 March 1959 for a third round Challenge Cup tie v  Wigan). The club finally moved out in 1998 to take part ownership and ground-share with Halifax Town FC at The Shay Stadium.

See also 
1935–36 Northern Rugby Football League season
Rugby league county cups

References

External links
Saints Heritage Society
1896–97 Northern Rugby Football Union season at wigan.rlfans.com
Hull&Proud Fixtures & Results 1896/1897
Widnes Vikings - One team, one passion Season In Review - 1896-97
The Northern Union at warringtonwolves.org

1935 in English rugby league
RFL Yorkshire Cup